Andrei Zintchenko (born 5 January 1972 in Samara) is a Russian former professional road bicycle racer active between the years 1994 and 2006. In his career, he won four stages in the Vuelta a España.

Palmarès 

1995
 2nd,  National Road Championships, Road Race
1998
 Vuelta a España
 1st, Stage 13
 1st, Stage 15
 1st, Stage 20
1999
 1st, Escalada a Montjuïc
2000
 1st, Stage 14, Vuelta a España
 3rd, Overall, Volta ao Algarve
 3rd, Overall, Volta a Portugal
2001
 3rd,  National Road Championships, Individual Time Trial
 3rd, Overall, Volta ao Alentejo
 2nd, Overall, Volta a Portugal
 1st, Stage 6
2002
 1st, Stage 2, Vuelta a Asturias
2003
 1st, Overall, Volta ao Alentejo
 1st, Stage 2
2006
 1st, Stage 4b, Vuelta Internacional a Extremadura

External links 

Sportspeople from Samara, Russia
Russian male cyclists
Russian Vuelta a España stage winners
1972 births
Living people